Steven Donato Cangialosi (born October 28, 1963) is a television play-by-play announcer for MLS on Apple TV. He was the New York Red Bulls announcer on the MSG Network, and also worked on MLS, Serie A, La Liga, DFB Pokal, Bundesliga and international soccer matches for ESPN.
Cangialosi replaced Mike "Doc" Emrick as the television voice of the New Jersey Devils when Emrick stepped down after 21 seasons in 2011. He served with color analyst and former NHL defenseman Ken Daneyko after working for three seasons with former NHL goaltender Chico Resch. Prior to this, Cangialosi served as the backup play-by-play announcer to Emrick and the primary studio host for pre/post and intermission studio shows. He has also had other various jobs in television and radio including a three-year run as a sports talk-show host on ESPN radio in New York City. Steve Cangialosi worked on his first Olympic Games at the London 2012 event, broadcasting several soccer matches.

Cangialosi worked on Red Bulls games with color analyst and former New York Cosmos goalkeeper Shep Messing and also occasionally worked on international soccer matches for BeIn Sport, Fox Sports and NBC Sports, where he has broadcast several Olympic, Gold Cup, and Europa League soccer matches. In addition to soccer matches, Cangialosi was also the former play-by-play announcer for the New Jersey Devils hockey team where he did calls for the team from 2011 to 2022.

Broadcasting career
Cangialosi began his broadcasting career at Sports Phone, a dial-in sports score service, while he was still attending college in 1984. After he spent a year as the sports editor at WNEW-FM, he worked in a similar capacity from 1987 to 1992 at WINS, where he was the station's youngest on-air reporter. He joined NY1 in August 1992 as one of the channel's original on-air personalities. He was the host of New York Sports on 1 during his eight years at NY1 until 2000. He concurrently was a talk-show host and sportscaster at ESPN Radio from 1997 to 2000. He also called soccer matches for Bein Sport. Cangialosi broadcasts hockey and soccer for ONE World Sports. Since 2016, he sporadically worked for ESPN on MLS and Serie A matches.

On May 17, 2022, Cangialosi announced that he would step down as the play-by-play announcer of the New Jersey Devils on the MSG Network. He continued doing play-by-play for the New York Red Bulls though the 2022 season. He was later succeeded by Bill Spaulding where he will do play-by-play commentary starting in the 2022-23 season.

Personal
A Queens native, Cangialosi was raised in South Ozone Park. He is the second of Victor and Rose Cangialosi's three sons. His father was a photographic technician at Authentic Color in New York City. After graduating from John Adams High School, Cangialosi earned a Bachelor of Arts in Journalism from New York University in 1985. He was married to Mallory Prestlien and the son-in-law of Robert Ivers.

References

National Hockey League broadcasters
New Jersey Devils announcers
Living people
1963 births
Association football commentators
Olympic Games broadcasters
New York Red Bulls
John Adams High School (Queens) alumni
New York University alumni
National Women's Soccer League commentators